The Czech Women's Cup (Czech: Pohár Komise fotbalu žen or Pohár KFŽ) is the national women's football cup competition in the Czech Republic. It was founded in 2007. The first final was held on 21 June 2008 in Humpolec.

Format
Teams from the first two tiers of women's football are able to enter the cup. Teams from the First League enter the cup only in the third round, which equals the round of 16.

List of finals
The following is a list of all finals so far.

See also
Czech Cup, men's edition

References

External links
Cup at women.soccerway.com
fotbal.cz

Cze
Women's football competitions in the Czech Republic
Recurring sporting events established in 2007